Periplaneta japanna is a subtropical field-dwelling cockroach endemic to southern Japan. The Japanese common name means urushi cockroach, or lacquer tree cockroach.

Nymphs and adults are a dark black, and typically live under stones and pieces of wood. Their ability to bore or live in rotting wood enables their spread via ocean currents.

The species is found on several Japanese islands, distributed continuously from Japan's southwestern Ryukyu Islands chain to the south of Kiyushu Island, and on Hachijō-jima Island.

Nymph specimens from Hachijō-jima Island and Naha, Okinawa responded to photoperiodic stimuli quite differently during laboratory-induced diapause tests. This “might be regarded as the result of divergent evolution” between the parapatric populations.

References

External links 
 Civil International Corporation's blog (in English, translated by Google), with many photos and observations concerning P. japanna. Retrieved 10 December 2013.
 Civil International Corporation’s blog (in Japanese). Retrieved 10 December 2013.

Cockroaches
Insects described in 1969